This is a list of the National Register of Historic Places listings in Garza County, Texas.

This is intended to be a complete list of properties listed on the National Register of Historic Places in Garza County, Texas. There are six properties listed on the National Register in the county, and one former listing. Two properties are Recorded Texas Historic Landmarks while the former property is a State Antiquities Landmark.

The publicly disclosed locations of National Register properties may be seen in a mapping service provided.

Current listings

|}

Former listing 

|}

See also

National Register of Historic Places listings in Texas
Recorded Texas Historic Landmarks in Garza County

References

External links

Garza County, Texas
Garza County
Buildings and structures in Garza County, Texas